Laia may refer to:

People
 Laia (given name), including a list of people
 Francisca Laia (born 1994), Portuguese sprint canoeist
 Bu Laia, Hawaiian comedian Shawn Kaui Hill
 Laia people, an indigenous Australian people of the state of Queensland

Other uses
 Laia (tool), a two-pronged type of foot-plough used in the Basque Country
 LAIA, the Latin American Integration Association 
 Laia, protagonist of the fantasy novel An Ember in the Ashes

See also 
 Leia (disambiguation)
 Laya (disambiguation)
 Lya (disambiguation)